The Love of the Brothers Rott (German: Die Liebe der Brüder Rott) is a 1929 German silent film directed by Erich Waschneck and starring Olga Tschechowa, Jean Dax and Paul Henckels. It was shot at the Staaken Studios in Berlin. The film's sets were designed by the art director Andrej Andrejew.

Cast
 Olga Tschechowa as Theresa Donath  
 Jean Dax as Donath - ihr Vater  
 Paul Henckels as Clemens Rott  
 Jameson Thomas as Robert  
 Ekkehard Arendt as Wolf 
 Alexej Bondireff as John Meyer  
 Jakob Tiedtke 
 Fritz Greiner 
 Paul Otto 
 Philipp Manning 
 Hermann Krehan
 Charles Vanel

References

Bibliography
 Hans-Michael Bock and Tim Bergfelder. The Concise Cinegraph: An Encyclopedia of German Cinema. Berghahn Books.

External links

1929 films
Films of the Weimar Republic
Films directed by Erich Waschneck
German silent feature films
Films based on German novels
German black-and-white films
Films shot at Staaken Studios